The Gabala FC 2012–13 season is Gabala's eighth season and seventh Azerbaijan Premier League season. They started the season under manager Fatih Kavlak, who was sacked on 24 September 2012 following a poor run of results and was replaced by Ramiz Mammadov. Mammadov was himself sacked on 2 April 2013 following 5 games without a win, with reserve team manager Luis Aragon taking over in a Caretaker role. Gabala also competed in the Azerbaijan Cup, entering at the Last 16 stage and beating Qaradağ before being eliminated in the Quarterfinals by Qarabağ.

Squad

Transfers

Summer

In:

Out:

Winter

In:

Out:

Competitions

Friendlies

Azerbaijan Premier League

Results summary

Results by round

Results

League table

Azerbaijan Premier League Championship Group

Results summary

Results by round

Results

Table

Azerbaijan Cup

Squad statistics

Appearances and goals

|-
|colspan="14"|Players who appeared for Gabala no longer at the club:

|}

Goal scorers

Disciplinary record

Team kit

These are the 2012–13 Gabala F.C. kits.

Notes 

Qarabağ have played their home games at the Tofiq Bahramov Stadium since 1993 due to the ongoing situation in Quzanlı.

References

External links 
Gabala FC Website
Gabala FC at UEFA.com
Gabala FC at Soccerway.com
Gabala FC at National Football Teams.com

Gabala FC seasons
Gabala